The Battle of the Hockey Enforcers (also known as Hockey Enforcers: Black & Blue) was a sporting event held at the CN Centre in Prince George, British Columbia, Canada, on August 27, 2005. The event consisted of ice hockey enforcers (mostly from minor and senior men's leagues) fighting on the ice in full hockey gear, as sometimes seen in regular games. Like in the National Hockey League, no fighting on the ground was allowed, and the referees separated the fighters if the fight turned too one-sided. For player safety concerns, officials also temporarily stopped fights if helmets or gloves were accidentally removed, with disqualifications in effect if they were removed on purpose. If a fight did not end in a referee stoppage, it was judged by a panel of hockey experts.

Hockey Enforcers was the brainchild of Canadian promoter Darryl Wolski, whose efforts to hold this show and find a willing city & venue were the subject of the feature Hockey Brawl: Battle on Thin Ice for CTV's W5, which won the Gemini Award in 2006 for Best Sports Program or Series. After failed attempts to host the event in Winnipeg, Manitoba and Philadelphia, Pennsylvania, and a measure of controversy due to the nature of hockey fighting, Hockey Enforcers was held in Prince George, British Columbia to some success. The CN Centre attracted about 2,000 spectators, only about one third capacity, and despite encouraging pay per view sales, a teased second show in the spring of 2006 never materialized. A DVD of the show, under the Hockey Enforcers: Black and Blue title, was subsequently released by Video Service Corp.

Commentators for this event were Ian Furness and then-AHL player Brantt Myhres, while Gilles Peloquin and Wayne Veary called the event in French. Amy Hayes served as the interviewer and announcer for pre-match introductions, while Ray Walker announced winners and decisions, and Geoff Gregoire was the lead referee. The rink-side judges were Paul Brown, John Craighead, and Steve Parsons. Songs by such artists as State of Shock, Seemless, Art of Dying and Bruce Kulick were used as entrance themes.

Though originally planned as a one night 16-man tournament with four round robin groupings and winners advancing to the semifinals (similarly to international ice hockey tournaments), a number of forfeits and byes were made due to injuries and other withdrawals. Advertising for the event listed 31 total bouts, but only 19 were held, including a pre-finals exhibition bout which saw Derek Parker defeat Jamie Leinhos via unanimous decision.

Participants

Most players in the tournament were selected from the Ligue Nord-Américaine de Hockey, a Quebec-based senior men's league that is notorious for high amounts of fighting in games. Aside from three who had retired from hockey before the tournament,  then-AHL player Mike Sgroi and online fan vote winner Eddie O'Toole were the only active players in the field that weren't on an LNAH roster. Three NHL alums competed in the tournament, they being Kent Carlson, Link Gaetz, and Jason Simon, though Gaetz withdrew after experiencing concussion-like symptoms after his first fight, and only Carlson was able to win a match at all between them. Fellow NHL veteran Lyndon Byers was also scheduled to compete, but pulled out of the event shortly before it began.

The tournament champion was UHL veteran Dean Mayrand, picking up the $62,250 top prize. He defeated minor league journeyman Mike Sgroi, then of the AHL's Albany River Rats, in the finals by split decision, after previously winning both of his group stage bouts. Jason Rushton was awarded third place after fellow semifinalist Steve Reid couldn't compete in a planned third place match.

Group stage

Group A

Group B

Group C

Group D

Knockout stage

See also
 Enforcer (hockey)
 Fighting in ice hockey

References

Ice hockey tournaments in Canada
Combat sports
Violence in ice hockey
2005 in British Columbia
2005 in ice hockey
2005 in boxing
2005 in Canadian sports
August 2005 sports events in Canada
Sport in Prince George, British Columbia
Sports competitions in British Columbia